IEC 60228 is the International Electrotechnical Commission (IEC)'s international standard on conductors of insulated cables.  the current version is Third Edition 2004-11
Among other things, it defines a set of standard wire cross-sectional areas:

In engineering applications, it is often most convenient to describe a wire in terms of its cross-section area, rather than its diameter, because the cross section is directly proportional to its strength and weight, and inversely proportional to its resistance. The cross-sectional area is also related to the maximum current that a wire can carry safely.

This document is one considered fundamental in that it does not contain reference to any other standard.

Description
The document describes several aspects of the conductors for electrical cables

Class
This refers to the flexibility and thermal effects i.e temperature of a conductor.

 Class 1: Solid conductor
 Class 2: Stranded conductor intended for fixed installation 
 Class 5: Flexible conductor
 Class 6: Very Flexible conductor

Size
The nominal (see below) cross-sectional area for standard conductors including the following:
 Class 2: Minimum number of strands required to make particular conductor size
 Class 5 and 6: Maximum diameter of any component strand of the conductor

Resistance
The maximum permissible resistance (in ohms per kilometre – Ω/km) of each conductor size, class and type (both plain copper and metal coated)

Purpose of the document

This document and its precursors were created due to a need for a standard definition of cable conductor size. The main problem being that not all copper has the same resistivity value, so, for example, a 4 mm2 conductor from two different suppliers may have different resistance values. Instead this document describes conductors by their nominal size, determined by resistance rather than physical dimensions. This is a key distinction as it makes a standardized definition of conductors based solely on their electrical characteristics.

Almost all characteristics of conductors, resistance, current carrying capacity etc. are dependent on the physical dimensions of the conductor. However this document allows an easy reference whereby the standard conductor sizes and reference to physical dimensions are maintained but given an exact meaning in terms of the electrical characteristics of a conductor.

Footnotes

See also
 
Circular mil, Unusual unit used as the North American Electrical industry standard for wires larger than 4/0.
American wire gauge (AWG), used primarily in the US and Canada
Standard wire gauge (SWG), the British imperial standard BS3737, superseded by the metric.
Stubs Iron Wire Gauge
Jewelry wire gauge
Body jewelry sizes
Electrical wiring
Number 8 wire, a term used in the New Zealand vernacular

References

External links 

 

60228
Wire gauges